The 2019 European U23 Judo Championships were the edition of the European U23 Judo Championships, organised by the European Judo Union. It was held in Izhevsk, Russia from 1–3 November 2019.

Medal overview

Men

Women

Medal table

Participating nations
There was a total of 235 participants from 33 nations.

References

External links
 Results
 

European U23 Judo Championships
 U23
Judo
European Championships U23
International sports competitions hosted by Russia
Judo European Championships U23